The Auray-Vannes Half Marathon is an annual road running competition over the half marathon distance (21.097 km) which takes place in early September in Brittany, France. The point-to-point course begins in the commune of Auray and finishes in the Stade de Kercado in nearby Vannes. Nearly 5000 people participated in the event in 2011. A record 6378 runners finished the half marathon in 1999.

The event was first held on 14 September 1975 under the organisation of the event-dedicated Association Courrir Auray Vannes and it has been held every September thereafter. In addition to the main half marathon, there are jogging and walking activities available as well as the shorter 10 km Arradon Vannes run (first held in 2001). The events take place around the natural harbour of the Gulf of Morbihan.

The half marathon competition attracts both amateur and elite-level competitors. The men's course record of 1:02:12 hours was set in 2001 by Kenya's William Cheseret. Rose Chelimo, another Kenyan, set the women's course record of 1:11:27 hours at the 2011 edition. In 1999, the competition acted as the French men's national championship race and Abdellah Béhar won the title. The race received IAAF Bronze Label Road Race classification in 2011 and 2012.

Past winners

Early editions
The course distance varied in the early years of the competitions. It began as a 24 km race, was 26 km in its second edition, then 25 km for the third edition. A 22.8 km course was used from 1978 to 1984. The race distance was 25 km for the 1985–1991 competitions.

Half marathon
Key:

References

List of winners
Festou, Michel et al (2011-09-11). Auray-Vannes Half Marathon. Association of Road Racing Statisticians. Retrieved on 2011-11-23.

External links
 

Recurring sporting events established in 1975
Half marathons in France
Sport in Morbihan
Annual sporting events in France
1975 establishments in France
Sport in Vannes
Autumn events in France

